Palazzo dello Sport may refer to:

 Milan
 Palazzo dello Sport (Milan), the original sports palace of Milan, built in 1923
 Palasport di San Siro, also called Palazzone or Palazzetto dello Sport di Milano, open from 1976 to 1985
 PalaSharp or Palazzetto dello Sport, open from 1986 to 2011
 Rome
 PalaLottomatica or Palazzo dello Sport
 Palazzetto dello Sport